Carroll Righter (February 2, 1900 – April 30, 1988) was known as the "astrologer to the stars." He wrote a syndicated daily advice column for 166 newspapers around the world and was reputed to be an advisor to Ronald and Nancy Reagan. Righter, who liked to be called the "gregarious Aquarius,' began doing charts for Hollywood notables in 1938 and became a columnist in 1950. Prior to that, he was a lawyer in Philadelphia. Although he is not mentioned by name, Righter is the author of the horoscopes analyzed by Theodor W. Adorno in his essay, "The Stars down to Earth" (1957).

Righter was mentioned in President Reagan's 1965 autobiography Where's The Rest of Me? and, according to former White House Chief of Staff Donald T. Regan, Mrs. Reagan turned to astrologers to help determine the president's schedule. Asked specifically whether he believed in astrology, President Reagan said, "I don't guide my life by it" but he added, "I don't know enough about it to say, is there something to it or not...and I don't mean to offend anyone who does believe in it, or engages in it." When Righter was asked in 1985 if he consulted with Ronald Reagan on astrology, he replied, "No comment."

Righter claimed he warned Marlene Dietrich to avoid working on a studio set one day because she might get hurt. His advice was not heeded, and Dietrich broke an ankle while reaching out to save a falling child. Word of the accident and Righter's advice led other celebrities to the astrologer, ensuring his fame. Among those who sought his advice were Arlene Dahl, Rhonda Fleming, Jane Withers, Hildegard Knef, Joan Fontaine and Grace Kelly. At one point in the late 1930s, the then-young Robert Mitchum worked as a ghost writer for Righter.

Righter wrote several books, including Astrology and You, the Astrological Guide to Health and Diet, and the Astrological Guide to Marriage and Family Relations.

See also

 Joyce Jillson
 Joan Quigley
 Jeane Dixon

References

External links
 
 
 Memorial

American columnists
American astrologers
20th-century astrologers
1988 deaths
1900 births
20th-century American non-fiction writers